Gros plant is a synonym for several wine grape varieties including:

Dolcetto
Folle Blanche
Gueuche noir
Peloursin